Cheshire County is the name of two counties:

 Cheshire County, New Hampshire in the United States
 Cheshire in north west England, United Kingdom
 Chester County